Lawrence County is a county in the U.S. state of South Dakota. As of the 2020 United States Census, the population was 25,768. Its county seat is Deadwood.

Lawrence County is coextensive with the Spearfish, SD Micropolitan Statistical Area, which is also included in the Rapid City-Spearfish, SD Combined Statistical Area.

History
Lawrence County was created January 11, 1875, and was organized in 1877. The county was named for "Colonel" John Lawrence, who came to the county as first treasurer in 1877. Lawrence had previously served in the Dakota Territorial Legislature, as a Sergeant at Arms for the United States House of Representatives, and a US Marshal for the Dakota territory. After retirement, he continued to act as county road supervisor and as an election judge. The title "Colonel" was honorary, bestowed by the governor of the Dakota Territory.

Geography
Lawrence County lies on the west side of South Dakota. Its west boundary line abuts the east boundary line of the state of Wyoming. The terrain of Lawrence County consists of mountains in the south and west, falling off to the hilly northeast portion. A tributary of the Redwater River flows east-northeasterly along a portion of the county's north boundary line, delineating that portion of the line. The terrain generally slopes to the county's northeast corner; its highest point is Crooks Tower, at 7,137'.

Major highways

  Interstate 90
  U.S. Highway 14
 U.S. Highway 14A
  U.S. Highway 85
  U.S. Highway 385
  South Dakota Highway 34

Adjacent counties

 Butte County - north
 Meade County - east
 Pennington County - south
 Weston County, Wyoming - southwest
 Crook County, Wyoming - west

Protected areas
 Black Hills National Forest (partial)
 Beilage Hepler State Game Production Area
 Coxes-Mirror Lakes State Game Production Area
 Harrison-Badger-Trucano State Game Production Area
 Iron Creek Lake State Game Production Area
 Reausaw Lake State Game Production Area
 Spearfish Canyon State Nature Area

Demographics

2000 census
As of the 2000 United States Census, there were 21,802 people, 8,881 households, and 5,559 families in the county. The population density was 27 people per square mile (11/km2). There were 10,427 housing units at an average density of 13 per square mile (5/km2). The racial makeup of the county was 95.79% White, 0.23% Black or African American, 2.18% Native American, 0.33% Asian, 0.05% Pacific Islander, 0.33% from other races, and 1.08% from two or more races. 1.82% of the population were Hispanic or Latino of any race. 36.0% were of German, 12.0% Norwegian, 9.0% English and 7.5% Irish ancestry.

There were 8,881 households, out of which 28.80% had children under the age of 18 living with them, 51.00% were married couples living together, 8.50% had a female householder with no husband present, and 37.40% were non-families. 29.60% of all households were made up of individuals, and 11.50% had someone living alone who was 65 years of age or older.  The average household size was 2.33 and the average family size was 2.89.

The county population contained 23.10% under the age of 18, 13.70% from 18 to 24, 25.40% from 25 to 44, 23.10% from 45 to 64, and 14.60% who were 65 years of age or older. The median age was 37 years. For every 100 females there were 96.80 males. For every 100 females age 18 and over, there were 93.30 males.

The median income for a household in the county was $31,755, and the median income for a family was $40,501. Males had a median income of $30,098 versus $19,679 for females. The per capita income for the county was $17,195. About 9.50% of families and 14.80% of the population were below the poverty line, including 15.70% of those under age 18 and 9.10% of those age 65 or over.

2010 census
As of the 2010 United States Census, there were 24,097 people, 10,536 households, and 6,181 families in the county. The racial makeup of the county was 94.4% white, 2.0% American Indian, 0.7% Asian, 0.4% black or African American, 0.5% from other races, and 2.0% from two or more races. Those of Hispanic or Latino origin made up 2.5% of the population. In terms of ancestry, 44.5% were German, 13.7% were Irish, 13.4% were English, 11.4% were Norwegian, and 4.4% were American.

Of the 10,536 households, 24.0% had children under the age of 18 living with them, 46.6% were married couples living together, 8.1% had a female householder with no husband present, 41.3% were non-families, and 33.2% of all households were made up of individuals. The average household size was 2.19 and the average family size was 2.77. The median age was 41.0 years.

The median income for a household in the county was $42,356 and the median income for a family was $60,209. Males had a median income of $38,933 versus $28,649 for females. The per capita income for the county was $25,465. About 8.4% of families and 15.3% of the population were below the poverty line, including 15.8% of those under age 18 and 8.1% of those age 65 or over.

Communities

Cities

 Central City
 Deadwood (county seat)
 Lead
 Spearfish
 Whitewood

Census-designated places
 Boulder Canyon
 Crook City
 Mountain Plains
 North Spearfish
 Saint Onge

Other unincorporated communities

 Beaver Crossing
 Benchmark
 Brownsville
 Cheyenne Crossing
 Chinatown
 Dumont
 Elmore
 Englewood
 Galena
 Gayville
 Hanna
 Nemo
 Preston
 Roubaix
 Savoy

Ghost towns

 Blacktail
 Greenwood
 Lincoln AKA Carterville
 AKA Midland or Garden City
 Merritt (partial)
 Nahant
 Terraville
 Tinton
 Trojan (AKA Portland)

Townships and unorganized territories
 St. Onge Township
 North Lawrence (unorganized territory)
 South Lawrence (unorganized territory)

Politics
Lawrence County voters have been reliably Republican for a full century. It was the only South Dakota county to remain loyal to Herbert Hoover in his landslide 1932 loss. In fact, Lawrence County was the second-westernmost county, behind only Utah’s Kane County, to never vote for Franklin D. Roosevelt. The only Democratic Presidential candidates to carry Lawrence County have been Woodrow Wilson in 1912 and 1916, and William Jennings Bryan in 1896. Lawrence County has also been one of the most consistent strongholds for the Libertarian Party, giving their 2016 nominee, Gary Johnson, one of the largest vote share out of any county outside his home state of New Mexico, with 7.9%. In 2020, Libertarian Party nominee Jo Jorgensen received 3.9% of the popular vote, her best performance in any county during the election cycle.

See also
 List of Superfund sites in South Dakota
 National Register of Historic Places listings in Lawrence County, South Dakota

References

Further reading
 Caddey, S.W. et al. (1991). The Homestake Gold Mine, an Early Proterozoic iron-formation-hosted gold deposit, Lawrence County, South Dakota [US Geological Survey Bulletin 1857-J]. Washington DC: US Department of the Interior, US Geological Survey.

External links
 
 Lawrence County, SD government website

 
1877 establishments in Dakota Territory
Populated places established in 1877
Black Hills